SS3, SS III, or similar, may refer to:

Vehicles and transportation
 SS-3 Shyster, a Soviet theatre ballistic missile
 SCA SS.3, an Italian fighter aircraft prototype
 SpaceShipThree (SSIII), a proposed spaceplane
 China Railways SS3, an electric locomotive model used in China
 SM U-12 (Austria-Hungary), a submarine of the Austro-Hungarian Navy, originally named SS-3
 , a submarine of the United States Navy
 SS 3 Flaminia, an Italian Strada Statale (State highway) linking Rome with Fano, on the Adriatic sea.

Entertainment, media, fiction
 "SS-3", a song by American thrash metal band Slayer, from their album Divine Intervention
 Slime Season 3, a 2016 mixtape by American rapper Young Thug
 Serious Sam 3: BFE, a 2011 video game by Croteam

Other uses
 Pindad SS3, an Indonesian assault rifle
 SS3, a C1 control character
 3rd SS, see List of Waffen-SS units

See also

 
 SS (disambiguation)